During the 2014–15 season, AFC Ajax participated in the Eredivisie, the KNVB Cup, the UEFA Champions League and the UEFA Europa League. The first training took place on Tuesday 24 June 2014. The traditional AFC Ajax Open Day was held on 3 August 2014.

Pre-season
The first training for the 2014–15 season was held on 25 June 2014. In preparation for the new season Ajax organized a training stage in Neustift, Austria. The squad from manager Frank de Boer stayed there from 15 June 2013 to 24 June 2013. During this training stage a friendly match was played against SDC Putten. The club then traveled to  Stubaital, Austria, for additional training. The squad stayed there from 30 June to 5 July. Further friendly matches were played against Wacker Innsbruck in Austria. Returning to the Netherlands, further friendly matches were scheduled against Aalborg BK Lyon and Real Sociedad.

Player statistics 
Appearances for competitive matches only

|-
|colspan="14"|Players sold or loaned out after the start of the season:

|-
|}
As of 17 May 2015

2014–15 selection by nationality

Team statistics

Eredivisie standings 2014–15

Points by match day

Total points by match day

Standing by match day

Goals by match day

Statistics for the 2014–15 season
This is an overview of all the statistics for played matches in the 2014–15 season.

2014–15 Team records

Topscorers

Placements

 Jasper Cillessen is voted Player of the year by the supporters of AFC Ajax.
 Anwar El Ghazi is voted Talent of the year by the supporters of AFC Ajax.
 Arkadiusz Milik finishes as topscorer of the KNVB Cup with 8 goals in 3 matches.

Competitions

Johan Cruyff Shield

Eredivisie

League table

Matches

KNVB Cup

UEFA Champions League

Group stage

UEFA Europa League

Knockout phase

Round of 32

Round of 16

 Dnipro Dnipropetrovsk advance to the quarter-finals based on away goal rule.

Friendlies 

1. Both matches cancelled by their respective football associations due to potential hooliganism after the Vuurwerkincident from the previous season.

Transfers for 2014–15

Summer transfer window
For a list of all Dutch football transfers in the summer window (1 July 2014 to 31 August 2014) please see List of Dutch football transfers summer 2014.

Arrivals 
 The following players moved to AFC Ajax.

Departures 
 The following players moved from AFC Ajax.

Winter transfer window 
For a list of all Dutch football transfers in the winter window (1 January 2015 to 1 February 2015) please see List of Dutch football transfers winter 2014–15.

Arrivals 
 The following players moved to AFC Ajax.

Departures 
 The following players moved from AFC Ajax.

References

External links 
Ajax Amsterdam Official Website in Nederlandse
UEFA Website

Ajax
AFC Ajax seasons
Ajax